Benete is a small settlement in the hills east of Nova Vas in the Municipality of Bloke in the Inner Carniola region of Slovenia.

References

External links 
Benete on Geopedia

Populated places in the Municipality of Bloke